Waipoua River is the name of two rivers in New Zealand.
 Waipoua River (Northland)
 Waipoua River (Wellington)